Balamba may refer to:

 Balamba, Burkina Faso
 Balamba, Democratic Republic of the Congo